Furneaux may refer to:

People
Furneaux (surname)

Other
Chapman and Furneaux, steam locomotive manufacturer with a works situated in Gateshead, Tyne and Wear, UK
Furneaux Group, group of 52 islands, at the eastern end of Bass Strait, between Victoria and Tasmania, Australia
Furneaux bioregion, an Australian biogeographic region that comprises the Furneaux Group
Furneaux burrowing crayfish (Engaeus martigener), a freshwater crayfish found in Australia
Furneaux Pelham, village and civil parish in Hertfordshire, England
Viscount Furneaux or Earl of Birkenhead, title in the Peerage of the United Kingdom

See also
Fourneau, surname
Fourneaux (disambiguation)